Uncle Vanya is a 1963 British film adaptation of the 1899 play Uncle Vanya by Anton Chekhov. The film was directed by Laurence Olivier and Stuart Burge. It was a filmed version of the Chichester Festival Theatre production, starring Laurence Olivier as Astrov, Michael Redgrave as (Vanya), Rosemary Harris as (Elena), and Joan Plowright as (Sonya).

Cast
 Max Adrian as Professor Aleksandr Vladimirovich Serebryakov
 Sir Lewis Casson as Ilya Ilych Telegin
 Fay Compton as Mariya Vasilyevna Voynitsky
 Rosemary Harris as Helena (Yelena) Andreyevna Serebryakov  
 Robert Lang as Yefim 
 Laurence Olivier as Dr. Mikhail Lvovich Astrov
 Joan Plowright as Sofia "Sonya" Alexandrovna Serebryakov 
 Sir Michael Redgrave as Ivan Petrovich ("Uncle Vanya") Voynitsky 
 Dame Sybil Thorndike as Marina Timofeevna

Reception
Harold Hobson of the Sunday Times described the production as "the admitted master achievement in British twentieth-century theatre", while The New Yorker called it "probably the best 'Vanya' in English we shall ever see".

Notes

External links

1963 films
British drama films
Films based on Uncle Vanya
Films directed by Stuart Burge
Films set in Russia
Films set in 1900
1960s English-language films
1960s British films